>> List of Vanity Fair caricatures (1870–1874)

The following is from a list of caricatures  published 1868–69 by the British magazine Vanity Fair (1868–1914).

Next List of Vanity Fair (British magazine) caricatures (1870–1874)

 
1868 in art
1869 in art
1868 in the United Kingdom
1869 in the United Kingdom